The Madonna of the Rose (Madonna della rosa) is a 1518-1520 painting, now in the Museo del Prado in Madrid. Its attribution as by Raphael is uncertain, and the involvement of Giulio Romano cannot be excluded. The rose and the lower portion were added at a later date by an unknown artist.  A second autograph version of this painting, without the added rose and lower strip, painted on wood panel, is owned by real estate magnate Luke Brugnara. In 2022, the painting was included in an exhibition held by the National Gallery.

See also
List of paintings by Raphael

Notes

References

External links
Prado catalogue entry

1520 paintings
Paintings of the Madonna and Child by Raphael
Paintings by Raphael in the Museo del Prado
Paintings of the Madonna and Child
Paintings depicting John the Baptist